Joseph Gregory Vath (March 12, 1918 – July 14, 1987) was an American prelate of the Roman Catholic Church. He served as the first bishop of the Diocese of Birmingham in Alabama from 1969 to 1987.  He previously served as an auxiliary bishop of the Diocese of Mobile-Birmingham in Alabama from 1966 to 1969.

Biography

Early life 
Joseph Vath was born on March 12, 1918, in New Orleans, Louisiana. He was ordained to the priesthood for the Archdiocese of New Orleans by Archbishop Joseph Francis Rummel on June 7, 1941.

Vath was appointed as auxiliary bishop of the Diocese of Mobile-Birmingham and titular bishop of Novaliciana on March 4, 1966, by Pope Paul VI.  Vath was consecrated on May 26, 1966 by Cardinal Egidio Vagnozzi.

Bishop of Birmingham 
Vath was appointed Bishop of Birmingham in Alabama, on September 29, 1969, by Paul VI.  At that time, the Diocese of Mobile-Birmingham was split into the Diocese of Birmingham in Alabama and the Diocese of Mobile.

In the 1980's, after the Catholic priest Edward Markley caused damage to an clinic providing abortion services, Vath issued a statement supportive of Markley. He stated that "If we are convinced that abortion is the taking of innocent life according to God’s revealed word, he is not acting unjustly according to God’s law in defending the innocent unborn one...The right to life certainly supersedes the right to property or to privacy."

Joseph Vath died in Birmingham, Alabama, on July 14, 1987, at age 69.

References

Episcopal succession

1918 births
1987 deaths
Roman Catholic Diocese of Birmingham in Alabama
20th-century Roman Catholic bishops in the United States
Bishops in Alabama